Qareh Baba or Qarah Baba may refer to:
 Qareh Baba, Abbas-e Sharqi, Bostanabad County, East Azerbaijan Province
 Qareh Baba, Ujan-e Sharqi, Bostanabad County, East Azerbaijan Province
 Qarah Baba, West Azerbaijan